Botryoideclava bharatiya is a chalcid wasp belonging to the family Aphelinidae. It parasitizes Melanaspis glomerata, a pest of sugarcane.

References

Aphelinidae
Insects described in 1980